The 2022 Supercopa de España de Baloncesto, also known as Supercopa Endesa for sponsorship reasons, was the 19th edition of the Supercopa de España de Baloncesto, an annual basketball competition for clubs in the Spanish basketball league system that were successful in its major competitions in the preceding season.

Real Madrid were the defending champion and defended the title successfully for their 5th Supercopa in a row and 9th in total.

All times are in Central European Summer Time (UTC+02:00).

Qualification 
The tournament will feature the winners from the three major competitions (2021–22 Liga Endesa, 2022 Copa del Rey and 2021 Supercopa Endesa), the host team and the remaining highest ranked teams from the 2021–22 Liga Endesa season if vacant berths exist.

Qualified teams 
The following four teams qualified for the tournament.

Venue 
On July 18, 2022, ACB selected and announced Seville to host the supercup in September 2022. The venue can hold up to 7,242 people for basketball games. It is part of a sports complex which also contains a gym, two swimming pools, chess playing hall, fitness rooms, aerobics, rehab and changing rooms. The arena hosted the 2014 FIBA Basketball World Cup along with five other Spanish cities, as well as 1994 Copa del Rey de Baloncesto, EuroBasket 2007 and 2008 Copa de la Reina de Baloncesto.

Draw 
The draw was held on 29 August 2022. Real Madrid as the league champion and Barça as the cup champion were the seeded teams.

Bracket

Semifinals

Coosur Real Betis vs. Real Madrid

Barça vs. Joventut

Final

References

External links 
 Official website 

Supercopa de España de Baloncesto
2022–23 in Spanish basketball
September 2022 sports events in Spain